Paul John Walter Allott (born 14 September 1956) is a former English cricketer who played county cricket for Lancashire, Minor Counties cricket for Staffordshire and first-class cricket in New Zealand for Wellington, as well as thirteen Test match appearances and thirteen One Day International appearances for England.

He was a powerfully built, skilful right-arm medium-fast swing bowler, who could also bat adequately at number 9. He was part of a Lancashire side that was successful in List A cricket, winning five trophies between 1984 and 1990, including the Refuge Assurance League in 1989. Allott helped to clinch the latter triumph with some late-order hitting in the deciding fixture.

A consistent county performer, he was at his best in English conditions, but lacked that extra zip to enjoy more than a respectable Test career. He scored his maiden first-class half century on his Test debut against Australia at Old Trafford in 1981, also taking four wickets in the match.  For three years he was in and out of the side, then had his best Test series in 1984 against the West Indies, taking his best Test figures of 6/61 at Headingley. However England lost every match in that series. He was forced home from the 1984–85 tour of India due to back trouble, and this effectively curtailed his progression in the Test match arena. He struggled in his last test series against Australia in 1985, and was replaced with Richard Ellison, who was instantly more successful. Sheepishly, he recollected: "They dropped me and picked Richard Ellison, so in a way I won the Ashes for England". In Tests he took 26 wickets at 41.69 each.

Allott left his job as a commentator for Sky Sports to become director of cricket at Lancashire for the 2018 season. He left this role at the end of the 2021 season.

References

1956 births
Living people
Directors of Cricket
English cricket commentators
English cricketers
England One Day International cricketers
Cricketers at the 1983 Cricket World Cup
England Test cricketers
Lancashire cricketers
Wellington cricketers
People from Altrincham
Marylebone Cricket Club cricketers
Staffordshire cricketers
Cheshire cricketers
English male non-fiction writers
Alumni of the College of St Hild and St Bede, Durham
Test and County Cricket Board XI cricketers
D. B. Close's XI cricketers